Best Karaokee! Song (最優秀カラオケソング賞)

Results
The following table displays the nominees and the winners in bold print with a yellow background.

2010s

Song awards